Deoneum (hangul: 더늠) is a new, revised section of a pansori song, made by a master pansori singer.

Following years of training, master singers sometimes change or add new parts to a pansori song, inputting aspects of their own individuality. If this new version of the pansori becomes widespread in its own right, then it is called a deoneum.

The oldest one, called "Going Out to Let a Swallow Go," is found in the song "Heungbuga," and was sung by Gwon Sam-deuk in the Joseon Dynasty. It was the first known application in pansori of gwonmasung (a chant sung by palanquin bearers).

Other cases of deoneum are:

"Namwongol playboy" in "Chunhyangga" was sung by Dal Yeo-gye, incorporating the first application of gyeonggi minyo (a Korean traditional song originating in the Seoul and Gyeonggi area) in pansori.

"Song in Prison" in "Chunhyangga" sung by Song Heung-rok, which is the first time Jinyang rhythm (a slow rhythm used in pansori) was applied in pansori.

References

Pansori